The Chocolate Room (TCR Cafe) is a chocolate cafe chain founded in Geelong, Australia by Yaju Vaghela and Koshish Shah in  2006 and acquired by the TCR International Food Group in 2007.

History 
The Chocolate Room opened its branches in Colombo, Sri Lanka in the year 2013. The Chocolate Room opened its Outlet in M.M.Alam Road, Lahore, Pakistan in the year 2016.

The Chocolate Room opened its 5th Outlet store in Bengaluru, India in the year 2017. The Chocolate Room opens its branches in Dhaka, Bangladesh in the year 2019. The Chocolate Room's 299th outlet is opened in Nepal in June 2019. The Chocolate Room has its outlet in Abu Dhabi, UAE.

The Chocolate Room Decided to open the co-working lounge in Hyderabad, India in the year 2019.

Among the total outlets of the Chocolate Room 180 are in India and rest of them in other countries like Oman, China and other.

The Chocolate Room is started in 2007 and now it is grown to 235 stores across India with the turnover of over ₹100 crore.

Awards 
Award for Images Most Admired Retailer of the Year "Food Service - National Operation" by Images South India Retail Awards 2018.

Award for "Images Most Admired Food Service Chain of the Year: Ice Cream and Dessert Parlours" by Start-ups & Innovations 2019.

Awards for "Food & General Retail" from India's Retail Champions 2020.

The Chocolate Room is awarded with Brand Impact Award in the year 2021.

See also 
 Café Coffee Day
 Tata Starbucks
 Costa Coffee

References

External links 
 Official website

Coffeehouses and cafés in Australia
Companies based in Victoria (Australia)
Coffeehouses and cafés in India